The Major League Baseball Draft is the process by which Major League Baseball (MLB) teams select athletes to play for their organization. High school seniors, college juniors and seniors, and anyone who had never played under a professional contract were considered eligible for the draft. The 1987 MLB Draft took place as a conference call to the Commissioner of Baseball's office in New York from June 2–4. As opposed to the National Football League Draft which appeared on ESPN, no network aired the MLB Draft.

The American League (AL) and the National League (NL) alternated picks throughout the first round; because an NL team drafted first in the 1986 MLB Draft, an AL team had the first selection in 1987. Having finished 67–95 in 1986, the Seattle Mariners had the worst record in the AL and thus obtained the first overall selection. The second selection went to the Pittsburgh Pirates, who had the worst record in the NL.

With the first overall pick, the Mariners drafted Ken Griffey Jr. from Moeller High School. Griffey Jr. became a 13-time All-Star and helped Seattle make its first postseason appearance in franchise history. Mark Merchant, the second overall pick, however, never played in a major league game. Two years after he was drafted, the Pirates traded Merchant to Seattle, where he got to meet Ken Griffey Jr. Chicago White Sox' first overall selection Jack McDowell won the 1993 Cy Young Award as Chicago made a League Championship Series appearance that year. The total number of athletes drafted, 1,263, broke a record for the most players ever chosen in a draft. In total, 27 All-Stars were selected in 1987, although not all signed a professional contract. , only  three players from the draft has been elected to the National Baseball Hall of Fame– Craig Biggio, Griffey, Jr, and Mike Mussina, though Mussina did not sign in this draft.

Background
As with prior drafts, the team with the worst overall record from the previous season selected first, with teams from the AL and NL alternating picks. If two or more teams had the same record, the team with the worse record from two seasons prior would draft higher. Because the Pittsburgh Pirates of the NL selected first overall in 1986 Major League Baseball Draft, an AL team had the first pick in the 1987 draft. The final two selections in the first round both came from American League teams, as the AL had two more organizations than the NL.

The date of the draft was set for June 2–4, and would occur as a conference call to the Commissioner of Baseball's office in New York. Unlike the 1987 NFL Draft, which aired on ESPN, no network televised the MLB draft. High school seniors, college juniors and seniors, and anyone who had never played under a professional contract were considered eligible to be drafted. For the first time, junior college players would also be included in the June draft; in years past, teams would select junior college players in a separate draft.

Selections could be transferred or added if a team signed a certain type of free agent: the Elias Sports Bureau ranked players as either type-A (top 30 percent of all players), type-B (31 percent to 50 percent), or type-C (51 percent to 60 percent), based on the athlete's performance over the past two seasons. If a "type-A" player became a free agent, the team that lost the type-A player would receive the first-round draft pick from the team that signed the player, as well as a "sandwich pick" between the first and second rounds. If a "type-B" became a free agent, the team that lost him would receive a second-round pick from the team that signed the player. If a "type-C" became a free agent, the team that lost him would receive a compensation pick between the second and third rounds. The top 13 selections were considered "protected picks" and exempt from this rule.

With a record of 67–95, the Seattle Mariners ended the 1986 Major League Baseball season with the worst record in the AL and thus obtained the first overall selection. The Mariners never had a winning record in the twelve years since the franchise's creation (their best winning percentage was .469, accomplished in 1982), and during the 1986 season, changed managers three times. In the NL, the Pirates finished with the league's worst record for the second year in a row and were given the second overall pick. The 1986 World Series champion New York Mets drafted third-to-last, with the runner-up Boston Red Sox selecting last.

First two rounds

Other players to reach MLB
The following players were drafted outside of the first two rounds and played in at least one major league game:

Aftermath
The Kansas City Royals had the most picks of any team, with 74; following the Royals, the Toronto Blue Jays made 71, and the Cincinnati Reds and New York Mets made 61 apiece. The total number of players drafted, 1,263, broke a record for the most players ever selected in a draft. The previous record of 1,162 was set during the 1967 draft. The California Angels drafted the fewest future MLB players, with only four of their draftees appearing in an MLB game, while the Blue Jays and the Texas Rangers both drafted 13 future MLB players, the most of any team.

With their first overall pick, the Mariners selected Ken Griffey Jr., an outfielder from Moeller High School. Over his 22-year career, Griffey Jr. was elected to thirteen All-Star games, won seven Silver Slugger Awards, and helped Seattle make their first playoff appearance as a franchise during the 1995 season. Mark Merchant, whom the Pirates drafted second overall, never played in an MLB game; two years after they drafted him, Pittsburgh traded Merchant to Seattle. The Pirates made the playoffs for three consecutive seasons from 1990–1992 but lost in the National League Championship Series all three years.

Notes

References
General

Specific

Major League Baseball draft
Draft
Major League Baseball draft
Major League Baseball draft
Baseball in New York City
Sporting events in New York City
Sports in Manhattan
1980s in Manhattan